No Comment were an American powerviolence band from North Hollywood, California. The band was active from 1987 to 1993.

History
Along with other powerviolence bands such as Crossed Out, Capitalist Casualties and Man Is The Bastard, No Comment were influential in what was known to become the "West Coast powerviolence" scene for their aggressive musical and conceptual take on the hardcore punk genre. The band's vocalist, Andrew Beattie, confessed to liking both the metal and hardcore genres while hating the direction crossover bands such as D.R.I. and Discharge took, which combined the two styles. Beattie stated his band "just wanted to show that 'Hardcore' was still alive yet there was no real 'scene in the late 80s'."

Break up
No Comment disbanded in 1993 and Beattie went on to pursue other music projects such as Man is the Bastard, Low Threat Profile, (with members of Infest), Dead Language (with members of Iron Lung and Walls) and most recently Dead Man's Life (with members of Life In A Burn Clinic, The Grim, Dead Lazlo's Place, For Sale, FYP, Co-Ed, La Motta, It's Casual, Revolution Mother and Buford). However some unreleased studio and live recordings were released after this time.

Legacy and influence
Powerviolence, according to Spazz bassist/vocalist, Chris Dodge, (who was behind the scene's main label Slap-a-Ham Records) peaked in the mid-1990s, around the time No Comment released their celebrated EP Downsided on Slap-a-Ham. XLR8R described Downsided as "a definitive document of powerviolence's beyond-tantrum aggression".

Discography
 Common Senseless 7" (1989, Snare Dance)
 Downsided 7" (1992, Slap-A-Ham)
 No Comment 7" (1994, Noise Patch)
 87-93 LP/CD (1999, Deep Six)
 Live On KXLU 1992 7" (2013, Deep Six)

See also
Slap-a-Ham Records

References 

Powerviolence groups
Hardcore punk groups from California
Musical groups established in 1987